Dato' Ismail bin Ahmad is a Malaysian politician and currently serves as Negeri Sembilan State Executive Councillor.

Election results

Honours 
  :
  Knight Commander of the Order of Loyalty to Negeri Sembilan (DPNS) – Dato' (2021)

References 

Living people
People from Negeri Sembilan
Malaysian people of Malay descent
People's Justice Party (Malaysia) politicians
21st-century Malaysian politicians
Members of the Negeri Sembilan State Legislative Assembly
Negeri Sembilan state executive councillors
1956 births